Nabanita Malakar is an Indian Bengali television actress who is known for playing Aishwarya on the TV serial Ei Chheleta Bhelbheleta and Shiuli on the TV serial Aponjon. She has also acted in other popular Bengali serials such as Mangal Chandi, Aponjon, Mahaprabhu Sree Chaitanya.

Television

Television

References

External links
 

Living people
Bengali television actresses
Year of birth missing (living people)